Mothers was an American band from Athens, Georgia, United States, composed of Kristine Leschper, Matthew Anderegg, Chris Taylor, and Garrett Burke. They released their debut album When You Walk a Long Distance You Are Tired, on February 26, 2016. Their sophomore album, Render Another Ugly Method, released September 7, 2018.

History
Mothers originally formed in 2013 as the solo project of musician Kristine Leschper. Leschper started making music while she was a student studying printmaking at the Lamar Dodd School of Art. Over the next year, Leschper began to garner a following alongside acclaim in the Georgia music scene. After garnering this attention, Leschper decided to recruit other musicians from Athens to form a full band. In November 2015, Mothers announced plans to release their debut album, When You Walk a Long Distance You Are Tired, on February 26, 2016. The album was released on Grand Jury Records in America and Wichita Recordings in England.

On June 20, 2018, Mothers announced the follow-up LP to their debut, titled Render Another Ugly Method, due to be released on September 7, 2018 on ANTI- Records. An accompanying tour throughout North America was announced in conjunction.

Band members
Kristine Leschper - guitar, vocals
Matthew Anderegg - drums, guitar 
Chris Goggins - bass 
Garrett Burke - drums (2017- ) 

Former Members -

 Mckendrick Bearden - Guitar, Bass, String Arrangements 
 Patrick Morales - Bass
 Drew Kirby - guitar (2014-2017)

Discography

Studio albums
When You Walk a Long Distance You Are Tired (2016, Grand Jury Records + Wichita Recordings)
Render Another Ugly Method (Anti-, 2018)

External links

References

Musical groups from Georgia (U.S. state)
Musical groups established in 2013
Anti- (record label) artists
Wichita Recordings artists
2013 establishments in Georgia (U.S. state)